Ghetto University is the debut studio album by Nigerian singer Runtown. It was released on November 23, 2015, by Eric Many Entertainment. The album was supported by four singles: "Gallardo", "The Banger", "Bend Down Pause" and "Walahi". It features guest appearances from Davido, Wizkid and Uhuru. As one of the album's executive producers, Runtown collaborated with producers such as Shizzi, T Spize, Del B, Maleek Berry, Uhuru and Pheelz.

Background
Runtown first hinted at Ghetto University during an interview with Vanguard newspaper in 2014. On 23 October 2015, the official release date for the album was announced via online media, followed by its cover art.

Singles
"Gallardo" was released as the album's lead single On 29 January 2014. It won Best Collaboration of the Year at the 2014 Nigeria Entertainment Awards. The accompanying music video for "Gallardo" was directed by Clarence Peters; it peaked at number one on MTV Base's list of the "Hottest Videos aired on the show in 2014". On 9 December 2014, Runtown released the Uhuru-assisted "The Banger" as the album's second single. The Wizkid-assisted "Bend Down Pause" was released as the album's third single on 12 June 2015, and "Walahi" was released as the fourth single.

Track listing

Personnel

Musicians
Davido – featured artist (track 3)
DJ Khaled – featured artist (track 1)
Uhuru – featured artist  (track 4)
Phyno – featured artist (track 7)
Wizkid – featured artist (track 11, 13)
Hafeez – featured artist (track 15)
Anatii – featured artist (track 14)
Barbapappa – featured artist (track 9, 16)
M.I – featured artist (track 15)

Personnel
Sticky – mastering engineer
George Nathaniel – mixing engineer
Olabodeskills & Bugo – artwork artist
Kelechi Amadi – photographer

Producers
Runtown – production (track 3)
Maleek Berry – production (track 2, 6, 12, 13, 15)
DJ Maphorisa – production (track 4, 8)
J-Stunt – production (track 14)
Del B – production (track 11)
El Puto – production (track 1)
Shizzi – production (track 7, 10, 17)
T-Spize – production (track 3)
KillBeatz – production (track 5)
Badr Makhlouki – production (track 16)
Pheelz – production (track 9, 16)

Release history

References

2015 debut albums
Igbo-language albums
Runtown albums
Albums produced by Shizzi
Albums produced by Maleek Berry
Albums produced by Pheelz
Albums produced by Del B
Albums produced by DJ Maphorisa